Rahel Shtainshnaider (born 10 February 1994) is an Israeli footballer who plays as a forward for Israeli club Hapoel Katamon Jerusalem and the Israel women's national team.

Club career
Shtainshnaider has played for Maccabi Tzur Shalom FC, Maccabi Kishronot Hadera FC, Hapoel Ironi Petah Tikva FC, ASA Tel Aviv, FC Kiryat Gat and Bnot Netanya FC in Israel.

She finished best scorer of Danish Women League.

On 30 January 2022, she joined the French women's football club Football féminin Yzeure Allier Auvergne.

In August 2022, Shtainshnaider returned to Israel, signing with Hapoel Katamon Jerusalem.

She is the first professional women player to play a final of a cup of the top five of best leagues in the world.

International career
Shtainshnaider has been capped for the Israel national team, appearing for the team during the 2023 FIFA Women's World Cup qualifying cycle.

Honors
 Finalist of the French Women Cup 2022

References

External links
 
 Rahel Shtainshnaider – UEFA competition record
 

1994 births
Living people
Israeli women's footballers
Women's association football forwards
Maccabi Kishronot Hadera F.C. players
Hapoel Petah Tikva F.C. (women) players
ASA Tel Aviv University players
F.C. Kiryat Gat (women) players
Israel women's international footballers
Israeli expatriate women's footballers
Israeli expatriates in Denmark
Expatriate women's footballers in Denmark
Israeli Ashkenazi Jews
Jewish Israeli sportspeople
Jewish footballers
Jewish sportswomen